Alucita adzharica is a moth of the family Alucitidae.

References

Moths described in 1994
Alucitidae